Peace, Love & Misunderstanding is a 2011 American comedy-drama film directed by Bruce Beresford and starring Jane Fonda, Catherine Keener, Jeffrey Dean Morgan, Elizabeth Olsen, Nat Wolff, Chace Crawford, Kyle MacLachlan, and Rosanna Arquette. It was filmed in the town of Woodstock, New York, the same town in which the film is set. The film had a gala premiere at the Toronto International Film Festival on September 13, 2011. It was released to theaters on June 8, 2012, starting in limited release. It was released on DVD and Blu-ray Disc on October 2, 2012.

Plot
When her husband tells her he wants a divorce, devastated Manhattan lawyer Diane heads upstate with her two teens to Woodstock to stay with her estranged hippie mother. In this charming village, Diane and her city kids get a new perspective on life: poetry-reading daughter Zoe becomes interested in a sensitive young butcher Cole, nerdy son Jake finds material for his first film project, and Diane herself grows close to a handsome carpenter/singer Jude. Most importantly, Diane finally gets the chance to end the ancient war with the mother she has not seen for two decades.

Cast
 Jane Fonda as Grace
 Catherine Keener as Diane
 Jeffrey Dean Morgan as Jude
 Elizabeth Olsen as Zoe
 Chace Crawford as Cole
 Nat Wolff as Jake
 Kyle MacLachlan as Mark
 Rosanna Arquette as Darcy
 Marissa O'Donnell as Tara
 Joyce Van Patten as Mariam
 Katharine McPhee as Sara

Reception
Peace, Love & Misunderstanding received negative reviews from critics. , the film holds a 30% approval rating on Rotten Tomatoes, based on 70 reviews with an average rating of 4.7 out of 10. The website's critics consensus reads: "Peace, Love, & Misunderstanding produces many unintentional laughs with its absurdly contrived plot and cheery insistence that everything is just super".

Soundtrack
A soundtrack has not been released for purchase.
 "Being On Our Own", performed by Fruit Bats
 "Scarborough Fair", performed by Jane Fonda
 "Scarlet Begonias", performed by The Grateful Dead
 "Loose Lucy", performed by The Grateful Dead
 "Cactus Flower Rag", performed by Harper Simon
 "False Hearted Lover Blues", performed by Levon Helm
 "You're Not The First", performed by Gary Knox and the Streethearts
 "The Shine", performed by Harper Simon
 "Everyday", performed by Vetiver
 "Stella Blue", performed by The Grateful Dead
 "The Weight", performed by Jeffrey Dean Morgan and Catherine Keener
 "Seems Like Yesterday", performed by Katharine McPhee
 "Didj On The Mothership", performed by Sympatico Rhythm Unit
 "Changing Colours", performed by Great Lake Swimmers
 "What's Been Going On", performed by Amos Lee
 "Hold On", performed by Angus & Julia Stone
 "None The Wiser", performed by Dorie Colangelo
 "The Devil's Got My Secret", performed by Mieka Pauley
 "Peace Love and Understanding", performed by The Gaylads
 "What'll We Do 'Till Dawn", performed by Jeffrey Dean Morgan
 "Piano Sonata 22 in F", performed by Blair McMullen
 "Tema con Variazioni", performed by Blair McMullen

References

External links
 
 
 
 
 

2011 films
2011 comedy-drama films
2011 independent films
American comedy-drama films
American independent films
Films about dysfunctional families
Films directed by Bruce Beresford
Films set in New York (state)
Films shot in New York (state)
Hippie films
2010s English-language films
2010s American films